Corrette is a surname. Notable people with the surname include:

Gaspard Corrette ( 1670–before 1733), French composer and organist
Michel Corrette (1707–1795), French organist, composer, and author of musical method books; the son of Gaspard

Surnames of French origin